Chadenac is a commune in the Charente-Maritime department in the Nouvelle-Aquitaine region, in the former province of Saintonge in southwestern France. Chadenac has a notable romanesque church and a small museum containing Merovingian and Roman artefacts. It lies 8 km from Jonzac and 9 km from Pons off the D142 road, close to the Way of St. James.

Population

Inhabitants are known as Chadenacais (M) and Chadenacaises (F).

See also
Communes of the Charente-Maritime department

References

External links

Eglise Saint-Martin de Chadenac
Romanesque Church in Chadenac
Directory of Mayors' Statistics - Chadenac

Communes of Charente-Maritime